For the Hell of It is the debut solo studio album by American rapper Hell Rell. It was released on September 25, 2007 via Koch Records. Production was handled by Dame Grease, AraabMuzik, DukeDaGod, AblazeDaArchitek, DVLP, Knoxville, Max Perry, Oddz N Endz, Tracsquad Movement, Q Butta, Rice, Yonny, and Hell Rell himself. It features guest appearances from Cam'ron, J.R. Writer, Juelz Santana, Styles P, Young Dro, Karen Civil, Asia & Ashley. The album peaked at number 55 on the Billboard 200, number 10 on the Top R&B/Hip-Hop Albums, and number 5 on both Top Rap Albums and Independent Albums.

Track listing

Charts

References

External links

Hell Rell albums
2007 debut albums
Albums produced by DVLP
Diplomat Records albums
MNRK Music Group albums
Albums produced by Dame Grease
Albums produced by AraabMuzik
Albums produced by Maxwell Smart (record producer)